Rosh HaAyin is a city in the Central District of Israel. To the west of Rosh HaAyin is the fortress of Antipatris and the source of the Yarkon River. To the southeast is the fortress of Migdal Afek (Migdal Tzedek).

History

Rosh HaAyin is named after its location at the source of the Yarkon River (rosh = head, ayin = fountain, spring). The location, and the ottoman Fort that had existed on the site since the 16th century, has historically been referred to as Ras Al-Ayn (same meaning as the Hebrew name). There was a Palestinian Arab village with the same in the location, which was abandoned in 1920s.

Rosh HaAyin was founded in the 1949 near the site of ancient Antipatris and the Ottoman fortress of Ras Al-Ayn and on the land of the depopulated Palestinian village of Majdal Yaba; about 1km north of the village site. Many of the early residents were religious Yemenite Jews airlifted to Israel in 1949 and 1950 in Operation Magic Carpet. They added Biblical words from Exodus 19:4 to the city's logo: "I (God) carried You on eagles' wings." The place was one of the Israel Ma'abarot (transit camps) in the 1950s.

In the 1990s, new neighborhoods were built, although the town still has a large Yemeni-Jewish population.

Archaeology

In 2015, archaeologists discovered a large ancient farmhouse. Among the other artifacts that were exposed in the farmhouse there were two silver coins from the fourth century BCE that bear the goddess Athena and the Owl of Athena. In addition, a monastery dating to the Byzantine period was discovered on one of the hills in the area and included a church, an oil press, residential quarters, and stables equipped with mangers and troughs, etc. In the church were colorful mosaics and also numerous Greek inscriptions.

Demographics
According to the Israel Central Bureau of Statistics (CBS), in 2018, the ethnic make-up of the city was 97.9% Jewish, with a predominant number of young people below the age of 19. The population growth rate was 9.7% at the end of 2019.

Economy

According to the CBS, there were 10,972 salaried workers and 1,033 self-employed in 2000. The mean monthly wage for a salaried worker was NIS 6,595, an increase of 11.2% over the course of 2000. Salaried males had a mean monthly wage of NIS 8,408 (a real change of 7.8%) versus NIS 4,857 for females (a real change of 13.1%). The mean income for the self-employed was 6,853. 628 people received unemployment benefits, and 1,057 received an income supplement.

In 2004, the  company discovered oil at the Meged 5 oil field near Rosh HaAyin. It is one of the largest on-shore oil fields in Israel. It began production in 2010, and produces oil as well as some natural gas.
TTI Telecom is located in Rosh HaAyin.

Education
According to the CBS, there are 24 schools in Rosh Ha'ayin, with an enrollment of 8,288. Eighteen were elementary schools, with an enrollment of 5,043, and high schools, have an enrollment of 3,245. In 2001, 58.8% of Rosh Ha'ayin's 12th grade students were entitled to a matriculation certificate.

High schools
 Atid Religious High School
 Yehuda Halevi-Begin High School

Sports
S.C Rosh Ha'ayin ("Moadon Sport Rosh Ha'ayin"), a football team who plays at "Liga Gimel Sharon".

Ironi Rosh HaAyin is a professional beach soccer team based in Rosh HaAyin, Israel.

Transportation

Public Transportation
The city of Rosh HaAyin is served by Afikim and Egged bus companies. These bus companies, especially Afikim, serve internal transit, and they connect Rosh HaAyin to nearby towns such as Kafr Qasim and Petah Tikva, to Tel Aviv, as well as along Highway 5 to the settlement of Ariel in the Occupied West Bank.
The city is served by Rosh HaAyin North railway station, located Northwest of the city. Herzliya–Ashkelon line runs through this station, and it connects Rosh HaAyin to Herzliya in the Northern direction, and to Petah Tikva, Tel Aviv, and Ashkelon in the Southern direction.

Roads
The city is located at the interchange between Highway 6 (Trans-Israel Highway) and Highway 5 (Trans-Samaria Highway). Westbound Highway 5 provides connections to North-South thoroughfares that connect to localities in the Tel Aviv Metro Area. Eastbound Highway 5 crosses into the Occupied West Bank, passing through Kafr Qassem/Kafr 'Ein Checkpoint. This highway provides connections to several settlements such as Ariel. Southbound Highway 6 provides connections to Jerusalem, Ben Gurion Airport, and further south to Beersheba. Northbound Highway 6 provides connections to Haifa and Galilee.

Route 444 connects the city to its southern neighbors like El'ad and its northern neighbor Jaljulia. Route 483 connects Rosh HaAyin to Petah Tikva to the west.

The city is also collected to Kafr Qassem via a bridge over Highway 5.

Airport
The closest major airport to the city is Ben Gurion Airport near Lod. The airport is located about 25km to the South, accessible via Highway 6.

Notable people

 Nadav Argaman (born 1960), former head of Shin Bet (Israel Security Agency)
 Eitan Cabel (born 1959), politician
 Sagiv Cohen (born 1987), footballer
 Omer Danino (born 1995), footballer
 Gal Gadot (born 1985), actress, producer, model, and former Miss Israel
 Benny Gantz (born 1959), former Chief of General Staff of the Israel Defense Forces; former Minister of Defense and Deputy Prime Minister 
 Odelya Halevi (born 1989), actress
 Yishai Levi (born 1963), singer
 Omer Peretz (born 1990), footballer

Twin towns – sister cities

 Kiryat Bialik, Israel
 Hurfeish, Israel
 New Orleans, United States
 Birmingham, United States
 Prague 1, Czech Republic
 Odessa, Ukraine
 Vanves, France
 Cixi, China

Gallery

References

External links

Cities in Israel
Sharon plain
Cities in Central District (Israel)
Yemeni-Jewish culture in Israel
Populated places established in 1949
1949 establishments in Israel